Schalk Jakobus Petrus Ferreira (born 9 February 1984) is a South African rugby union player for the  in the Pro14. He has been playing first rugby since 2005 and normally plays as a loosehead prop.

Rugby career

Youth rugby

Ferreira was born in Pretoria, where he also attended primary school, before moving to the Western Cape, where he attended Stellenbosch-based high school Paul Roos Gymnasium. He was included in various  representative teams during his school days, representing them at Under-16 level in 2000 and playing at the premier South African schools competition, the Under-18 Craven Week on two occasions – in 2001 for a Coastal Western Province combination side and in 2002 for Western Province. After the 2002, he was also included in a South African Schools squad that played matches against their French and Welsh counterparts.

In 2003, Ferreira was included in the South Africa Under-19 squad that played at the 2003 Under-19 Rugby World Championship held in Paris. He helped South Africa win the tournament, beating New Zealand's Under-19 team 22–18 in the final. He returned to South Africa to represent Western Province in the Under-20 Provincial Championship in the latter half of 2003.

Ferreira was included in the South Africa Under-21 squad that played in the Under-21 Rugby World Championship held in Scotland in 2004. and helped them to finish third in the competition, beating Australia Under-21 44–10 in the third-place play-off. He also continued to represent Western Province's Under-20s in the Provincial Championship in 2004.

Western Province / Stormers

In 2005, Ferreira was included in a domestic first class squad for the first time, being named in their squad for the 2005 Vodacom Cup. In his fifth appearance for the side against Western Cape rivals , Ferreira scored his first senior try in a 32–36 defeat in Cape Town. He eventually played in all seven of their matches in the competition, but could not help them secure a place in the semi-finals as they finished in third position in Section Y of the competition. He reverted to the  side for the second half of the year.

Ferreira made six starts and one appearance from the bench in the expanded 2006 Vodacom Cup as Western Province finished in seventh position in the fourteen-team competition. His second Currie Cup start – in the return leg against the Falcons in Round 12 of the competition – saw him score his first ever Currie Cup try shortly before half-time in a 66–13 victory. He played in ten of their fourteen matches during the regular season – starting three of those – as Western Province finished third on the log to qualify for the play-offs.

In 2007, Ferreira was included in the ' squad for the 2007 Super 14 season. The Stormers won just six out of their 13 matches in the competition to finish in tenth position on the log. He played in eight of 's first nine matches in the 2007 Currie Cup Premier Division before a fractured rib ruled him out of the remainder of the season.

Ferreira suffered a neck injury in a car crash during the off-season prior to the 2008 Super 14 season which ruled him out of the start of the competition. Despite suggestions that Ferreira would be forced into retirement following the injury, he returned to action for the final four rounds of the competition, making two starts and two appearances as a replacement as the Stormers just missed out on a play-off spot, finishing in fifth position on the log. He appeared in a compulsory friendly match against an East Cape XV, helping Western Province to a 63–17 win before starting the first two matches of the Currie Cup Premier Division. He dropped behind Wicus Blaauw in the pecking order for the remainder of the competition, making eight appearances off the bench as Western Province finished in fifth position, missing out on the play-offs.

Ferreira made just two appearances from the bench for the  during the 2009 Super 14 season and also played one match for Western Province in the 2009 Vodacom Cup. He featured in a compulsory friendly match prior to the 2009 Currie Cup Premier Division, in which he also made one appearance. However, he suffered further injury to the vertebrae in his neck and he announced his retirement from rugby at the end of the 2009 season.

Return to rugby

After completely missing the 2010 and 2011 seasons, Ferreira reversed his decision to retire and rejoined  prior to the 2012 season. He played in all ten of their matches in the 2012 Vodacom Cup competition and helped them win the competition for the first time in their history, beating  20–18 in a final that Ferreira started.

Eastern Province Kings / Southern Kings

After making his debut for the Eastern Province Kings in a match against a South African Students team, he made ten appearances for the Eastern Province Kings in the competition – starting all of those – as they topped the log to qualify for the title play-offs.

In 2013, Ferreira was named in  squad for their first season of Super Rugby. He firmly established himself as their first-choice loosehead prop, starting in the Kings' first 15 matches in the competition. He started their 19–26 defeat in the first leg and – despite scoring a try 12 minutes from the end of their second leg match which helped them to a 23–18 victory – could not prevent the Lions win the series by an aggregate score of 44–42, which resulted in the Kings losing their Super Rugby status for 2013.

Toulouse

Ferreira joined the exodus of players that left the Kings after they lost their Super Rugby relegation play-off series, moving to France to join Top 14 side . He initially signed for the side as a medical joker following an injury to Vasil Kakovin, but was later rewarded with a three-year contract.

He appeared in 21 of Toulouse's remaining 22 matches in the round-robin stage of the competition, starting 11 of those matches. He also featured for Toulouse during the 2013–14 Heineken Cup; he played in all Toulouse's matches in the pool stage of the competition, helping them finish top of Pool 3 with five wins in their six matches, and came on as a replacement in the quarter final, where they lost 23–47 to Irish side Munster.

During the off-season, Ferreira returned to South Africa as a member of a World XV that played against South Africa in a one-off match during the 2014 mid-year rugby union internationals. He appeared as a second-half replacement as South Africa won 47–13 in Cape Town.

Ferreira's final appearance for Toulouse came in their match against  in Round 24 of the competition. He played off the bench in the second half and scored a try a few minutes later, his first in a Toulouse shirt.

Return to Eastern Province Kings / Southern Kings

Ferreira was released from his contract with Toulouse a year early and he returned to Port Elizabeth, signing a contract with the  until the end of 2017. He started five matches and played off the bench in four matches during the 2015 Currie Cup Premier Division, helping them finish in seventh spot on the log.

At the end of 2015, severe financial problems at the Eastern Province Kings resulted in players' wages not being paid for several months and their affiliated Super Rugby franchise, the  – due to return to Super Rugby in 2016 after a two-year absence – being taken over by the South African Rugby Union. Ferreira was one of 20 Eastern Province Kings players that secured a contract from SARU to represent the Kings in 2016.

Statistics

References

External links

1984 births
Living people
Rugby union players from Pretoria
South African rugby union players
South African people of Portuguese descent
White South African people
Stormers players
Western Province (rugby union) players
Rugby union props
Rugby union hookers
Eastern Province Elephants players
Southern Kings players
Boland Cavaliers players
Stade Toulousain players
Free State Cheetahs players
Cheetahs (rugby union) players